Giuseppe Melani or Milani (13 August 1673 - 7 November 1747) was an Italian painter of the late-Baroque period, active mainly in Pisa.

Biography
His father, Pietro Milani, was a painter. He initially apprenticed with Camillo Gabrielli, a pupil of Ciro Ferri. For the Pisa Cathedral, he painted a Death of San Ranieri. He also painted figures for architectural frescoes, such as the vault of San Matteo (c. 1720) in Pisa, along with his brother Francesco Melani (also an architect, April 7, 1675 -August 21, 1742). Among the pupils of Melani were Tommaso Tommasi, Giuseppe Bracci, Jacopo Donati, Bartolommeo Santini, and Ranieri Gabbrielli.

References

External links

1673 births
1747 deaths
People from Pisa
17th-century Italian painters
Italian male painters
18th-century Italian painters
Painters from Tuscany
Italian Baroque painters
Quadratura painters
18th-century Italian male artists